Summerfield High School is a K-12 school in Summerfield, Claiborne Parish, Louisiana, United States. It is a part of Claiborne Parish School Board.

 the school had 282 students. 
Gibsland-Coleman

Athletics
Summerfield High athletics competes in the LHSAA.

Championships
Boys' Basketball Championship
(1) 2016

Girls' Basketball Championship
(1) 2016

Basketball Championship history 
Summerfield High won both the boys' and girls' basketball state championships in 2016; although other schools have accomplished similar feats, it was believed to have been the first time it was completed with both teams having the same coach (Randy Carlisle).

References

Notes
 Some content originated from Summerfield, Louisiana

External links
 Summerfield High School
 

Schools in Claiborne Parish, Louisiana
Public high schools in Louisiana
Public middle schools in Louisiana
Public elementary schools in Louisiana